The spouse of the Governor of West Virginia is given an honorary position, styled as First Lady or First Gentleman of the State of West Virginia. To date there have been no female governors of the State of West Virginia, and all first spouses have been first ladies.

The current first lady of West Virginia is Cathy Justice, the wife of incumbent Governor Jim Justice who assumed office in 2017.

Role 
The position of the first lady is not an elected one, carries no official duties, and receives no salary. However, the first lady holds a highly visible position in state government. Since 1893, the role of the first lady includes serving the host of the West Virginia Governor's Mansion. She organizes and attends official ceremonies and functions of state either along with, or in place of, the governor. It is common for the governor's spouse to select specific, non-political, causes to promote.

List

See also 

 List of governors of West Virginia

References 

American political hostesses
Women's social titles
Lists of spouses
First Ladies and Gentlemen of West Virginia